Berberis aetnensis is a shrub in the family Berberidaceae described as a species in 1826. It is native to southern Italy (Campania, Basilicata, Calabria, Sicily, Sardinia) Croatia, Bosnia and Herzegovina and Montenegro. The species is named for Mount Etna in Sicily.

References

aetnensis
Flora of Southeastern Europe
Plants described in 1826
Taxa named by Carl Borivoj Presl